The Community of Portuguese Language Countries has nine member states. All have the Portuguese language as official language, and only East Timor and Equatorial Guinea have a second official language.

In 2005, CPLP Council of Ministers meeting in Luanda adopted the status of associate observer for non-member states to promote better international co-operation to reach the Community's objectives and 3 states were subsequently admitted.

Members

Observers

Officially interested countries and territories

Notes

References

 
Community of Portuguese Language Countries
Community of Portuguese